Harriss is a surname. For the meaning and origins of this name please refer to Harris (surname).

Harriss may refer to:
 Charles A.E. Harriss (1862-1929), English then Canadian composer, impresario, educator, organist-choirmaster, conductor
 Cynthia Harriss, American retail and tourism industry executive
 Edmund Harriss (b. 1976), British Mathematician and Artist
 Gerald Leslie Harriss (1925-2014), English historian of the Late Middle Ages
 Julian Harriss (1914-1989), American director of public relations for University of Tennessee
 Paul Harriss (b. 1954), independent member of the Tasmanian Legislative Council of Huon, Australia
 Slim Harriss (1896-1963), American pitcher who played in Major League Baseball

See also
 Harries
 Harris
 Herries

Surnames